In enzymology, an L-amino-acid alpha-ligase is an enzyme that catalyzes the chemical reaction

ATP + an L-amino acid + an L-amino acid  ADP + phosphate + L-aminoacyl-L-amino acid

Thus, the two substrates of this enzyme are ATP and L-amino acid, whereas its 3 products are ADP, phosphate, and L-aminoacyl-L-amino acid.

This enzyme belongs to the family of ligases, specifically those forming carbon-nitrogen bonds as acid-D-amino-acid ligases (peptide synthases).  The systematic name of this enzyme class is L-amino acid:L-amino acid ligase (ADP-forming). Other names in common use include L-amino acid alpha-ligase, bacilysin synthetase, YwfE, and L-amino acid ligase.

References

 

EC 6.3.2
Enzymes of unknown structure